The Fertile Crescent Plan was an Iraqi Hashemite proposal for the union of the Kingdom of Iraq with Mandatory Syria (including Mandatory Lebanon), Mandatory Palestine, and Transjordan. Nuri as-Said, prime minister of Iraq, presented the plan to British officials during World War II, when it appeared that France had become too weak to hold on to Syria. 

The second People's Party, representing northern Syrian commercial and landholding interests, favored the Fertile Crescent Plan and initiated diplomatic steps to implement it. However, the National Party and factions in the army were determined to block any plans for unity with Iraq as long as it had a military treaty with Great Britain. It was also opposed by Syrians who did not wish to live under a monarchy or in a pro-British state. The closest the plan came to fruition was during the regime (August-December 1949) of Colonel Sami al-Hinnawi, who had installed a People's Party government that entered negotiations to achieve unity. The opportunity was aborted by Colonel Adib Shishakli's coup d'état. Any faint hope remaining for the Fertile Crescent Plan ended with the overthrow of the Iraqi monarchy in July 1958.

Aspirations to unite the Fertile Crescent states continue to exist.

See also
Fertile Crescent
Greater Syria
Syrian Social Nationalist Party
Damascus Protocol
Sykes–Picot Agreement
Pan-Arabism

References

Bibliography
Commins, David Dean. Historical Dictionary of Syria, p. 105. Scarecrow Press, 2004, .

Pan-nationalism
Pan-Arabism
Proposed political unions
1940s in Asia
1940s in Iraq
1940s in Transjordan
1940s in Lebanon
1940s in Mandatory Syria
1940s in Syria
Iraq–Jordan relations
Iraq–Syria relations
Jordan–Syria relations 
Lebanon–Syria relations
1940s in Mandatory Palestine
Iraq–Lebanon relations
Jordan–Lebanon relations